is a Japanese American economist and a professor of economics at Princeton University. His research is on asset pricing, insurance, and household finance.

Education 
Motohiro Yogo earned an A.B. in economics from Princeton University in 2000 and a Ph.D in economics from Harvard University In 2004.

Career 
Yogo began his career as an assistant professor of finance at the Wharton School of the University of Pennsylvania. He joined the research department at the Federal Reserve Bank of Minneapolis as a monetary advisor in 2010. He was appointed a professor of economics at Princeton University in 2015. He is a faculty affiliate of the Bendheim Center for Finance and the Julis-Rabinowitz Center for Public Policy and Finance.

Yogo is a research associate of the National Bureau of Economic Research and a co-director of the NBER Insurance Working Group. He is an associate editor of the Journal of Risk and Insurance since 2019. He previously served as an associate editor of the Review of Financial Studies from 2016 to 2019 and the Review of Economics and Statistics from 2012 to 2014.

Research 
Yogo's research contributions include demand system asset pricing, the financial economics of insurance, and a test for weak instruments in instrumental variables regression.

Selected publications 

 A Demand System Approach to Asset Pricing
Shadow Insurance
 The Cost of Financial Frictions for Life Insurers
 Durability of Output and Expected Stock Returns
 Efficient Tests of Stock Return Predictability
 A Consumption-Based Explanation of Expected Stock Returns
 Testing for Weak Instruments in Linear IV Regression

Awards 

 GPIF Finance Award (2019)
 Swiss Finance Institute Outstanding Paper Award (2014)
 Roger F. Murray Prize (2012)
 Zellner Thesis Award in Business and Economic Statistic (2005)

References

External links 

Personal website
 Profile on Google Scholar

Princeton University faculty
Harvard Graduate School of Arts and Sciences alumni
Wharton School of the University of Pennsylvania faculty
Princeton University alumni
21st-century American economists
Economics journal editors
American academics of Japanese descent
Year of birth missing (living people)
Living people